Santa Teresa District is one of ten districts of the La Convención Province in the Cusco Region of Peru.

Santa Teresa, Peru is situated 6.5 km northwest of Machu Picchu and is at the axis of several important routes leading to this archeological centre, including alternative paths ways to the ruins (previously the railway was the only means of reaching Machu Picchu). In 1998, a landslide completely buried the town and destroyed the bridge that connected it to Machu Picchu and Cusco, however the bridge has subsequently been rebuilt.

Geography 
The Willkapampa mountain range traverses the district. The highest peak in the range is Salkantay at 6,271 m (20,574 ft). Other mountains are listed below:

 Chawpimayu
 Chuqitakarpu
 Kiswar 
 Puka Puka
 Phaqcha
Salkantay
 Qayqu
 Qayqu (near Pumasillu)

See also 
 Llaqtapata
 Quriwayrachina

References

 Inka Magik helping with environmental activities and schools in Santa Teresa